Diran Kelekian (Dikran Kelegian, 1862 – 1915) was an Ottoman Armenian journalist and professor at the Darülfünûn-u Şahâne (now the University of Istanbul). He was editor of two newspapers, Cihan (since 1883) and Sabah (since 1908).

He studied in Constantinople (Istanbul) and at the French Academy of Sciences at Marseilles, then became a lecturer at Ottoman University of Constantinople.  He fled to Europe during the anti-Armenian violence of the 1890s and returned to Istanbul in 1898, becoming the editor of Sabah. He soon fled the country again, spending the middle 1900s in Cairo and returning after the Young Turk Revolution.   He also worked as a correspondent of Daily Mail and Presse Associe, published journalistic works in Turkish using Armenian letters, compiled a French–Turkish dictionary. 

Kelekian was arrested in April 1915 during the Armenian genocide, deported to Çankırı and killed.

See also
Deportation of Armenian intellectuals on 24 April 1915

References
Chrisopher J. Walker, Armenia: The Survival of a Nation, revised second edition, 1990; page 427.
Friedrich Schrader, "Politisches Leben in der Türkei", Die Neue Zeit 1919 (37.2): 463.

External links
On dokuzuncu asırda içtimai ve siyasi Avrupa (1914)

1862 births
Date of birth missing
1915 deaths
Date of death missing
People from Kayseri
Turkish-language writers
People who died in the Armenian genocide
Armenians from the Ottoman Empire
Scientists from the Ottoman Empire
19th-century journalists from the Ottoman Empire
20th-century journalists from the Ottoman Empire
19th-century businesspeople from the Ottoman Empire
Journalists killed in Turkey
Turkish male writers